The Brylcreem Boys is a 1998 romantic comedy film set in Ireland during the Second World War. The film, which stars Billy Campbell, Angus Macfadyen, Jean Butler and Gabriel Byrne, was directed and co written by Terence Ryan. The story is set against the extraordinary neutrality arrangements in Ireland during World War II.

The title comes from a popular nickname for the RAF personnel during the period. Not to be confused with the identically titled 1979 BBC2 TV play about RAF Bomber Command.

Plot
During World War II, all Allied and Axis service personnel that end up in Ireland are to be interned for the duration of the conflict. Two pilots, one from the Royal Canadian Air Force, Miles Keogh, portrayed by Campbell and one from the Luftwaffe, Rudolph von Stengenbek, portrayed by Macfadyen, both fall in love with a local Irish girl, Mattie Guerin played by Butler. The relationship is further complicated by Byrne, who plays the unceasingly vigilant internment camp commander, Commandant O'Brien.

Cast
Billy Campbell (credited as Bill Campbell) as Miles Keogh
 Jean Butler as Mattie Guerin
 Gabriel Byrne as Commandant O'Brien
 Hal Fowler as Bunty Winthrop
 Joe McGann as Captain Deegan
 Angus Macfadyen as Rudolph von Stegenbek
 William McNamara as Sam Gunn
 Jérôme Pradon (credited as Jerome Pradon) as Ricard
 John Gordon Sinclair as Richard Lewis
 Marc Sinden as Senior Allied Officer White
 Oliver Tobias as Hans Jorg Wolff
 Peter Woodward as Ernst Stossel

Production
Although set in Ireland, the film was made on location in the Isle of Man. It was the first major production to use the island since George Formby's No Limit in 1935. The film established the Isle of Man Film Commission.

Casting was by Jo Gilbert.

See also
 Brylcreem
Irish neutrality

References

External links

British war films
World War II prisoner of war films
Films set in Ireland
1997 films
1990s English-language films
Films directed by Terence Ryan
1990s British films